Arne Bergseng (born March 22, 1961) is a former Norwegian ice hockey player. He was born in Lillehammer, Norway, and is the brother of Lars Bergseng. He played for the Norwegian national ice hockey team at the 1984 Winter Olympics.

References

External links

 

1961 births
Living people
Furuset Ishockey players
Ice hockey players at the 1984 Winter Olympics
Lillehammer IK players
Norwegian ice hockey players
Olympic ice hockey players of Norway
Sportspeople from Lillehammer
Storhamar Dragons players